Natalia Escuriola Martinez (born 1 August 1994) is a professional golfer from Spain. She won the 2013 European Ladies' Team Championship and has played on the Ladies European Tour.

Amateur career
Escuriola was born in Castellón de la Plana in 1994 and was introduced to golf at age five. She had a successful amateur career and won the 2014 Campeonato de Espana Intercubes. In 2015, she won the Campeonato de Alicante and the Campeonato de Madrid, ahead of Nuria Iturrios. She was also runner-up at the 2013 Spanish International Stroke Play behind Luna Sobrón. In 2014, she was runner-up at the Copa Andalucia behind Nuria Iturrios, and runner-up at the same event again in 2015, this time behind María Parra Luque. In 2014, she finished third at the Portuguese International Ladies Amateur Championship. 

As part of the National Team, Escuriola represented Spain at the European Girls' Team Championship and the European Ladies' Team Championship, winning the event in 2013. She represented Europe in the 2013 Vagliano Trophy.

Professional career
Escuriola joined the LET Access Series in 2015 and started the season as an amateur, opting to turn pro in September ahead of the last two tournaments of the season. She had two victories, the first in the CitizenGuard LETAS Trophy in Belgium while still an amateur, and her second in the season finale, the WPGA International Challenge in England, after she turned professional. She finished in the top-3 in four other tournaments and finished second in the LETAS Order of Merit, earning a full card for the 2016 Ladies European Tour season.

In 2016, her rookie year on the LET, Escuriola played in 11 tournaments and made two cuts. In 2017, her best finish was 5th at the Andalucia Costa Del Sol Open De España, six strokes behind winner Azahara Munoz. In 2018, she finished tied 4th at the same event.

She won gold at the 2018 Mediterranean Games in the women's team event with Marta Sanz and Patricia Sanz.

Escuriola also play on the Santander Golf Tour in her native Spain, where she has won several tournaments, and also the season ranking in 2018, 2019 and 2022.

Amateur wins 
2014 Campeonato de Espana Intercubes
2015 Campeonato de Madrid, Campeonato de Alicante

Source:

Professional wins (8)

LET Access Series wins (2)

Santander Golf Tour wins (5)

Other wins (1)
2015 Disa Campeonato de España
Source:

Team appearances
Amateur
European Girls' Team Championship (representing Spain): 2011, 2012
European Ladies' Team Championship (representing Spain): 2013 (winners), 2014, 2015
Vagliano Trophy (representing the Continent of Europe): 2013 (winners)

Professional
Mediterranean Games (representing Spain): 2018 (winners)

References

External links

Spanish female golfers
Ladies European Tour golfers
Mediterranean Games gold medalists for Spain
Mediterranean Games medalists in golf
Competitors at the 2018 Mediterranean Games
Sportspeople from Castellón de la Plana
1994 births
Living people
20th-century Spanish women
21st-century Spanish women